Us-kab-wan-ka River, also known as the Ush-kab-wan River, is a small tributary of the Cloquet River in northeast Minnesota in the United States.

Its name in the Ojibwe language is askibwaanikaa-ziibi (river full of Jerusalem artichokes), having the identical name in Ojibwe as the nearby Artichoke River.

Course
Via the Cloquet River and the Saint Louis River, it is part of the watershed of Lake Superior.  It flows through Whiteface Reservoir Unorganized Territory and Grand Lake Township in southern Saint Louis County.

The river begins at the outlet of Rush Lake in Cloquet Valley State Forest and flows generally southwest, then southward. It flows into the Cloquet River, two miles south of Taft.

See also
List of Minnesota rivers

References

Rivers of Minnesota
Rivers of St. Louis County, Minnesota
Tributaries of Lake Superior